Eduardo Alonso Arriola Carter (born 11 October 1972 in Tela, Atlántida) is a retired Honduran football player.

Club career
He has played for Olimpia, Chinese side Guangzhou Baiyunshan and for FAS and Dragón in El Salvador. In September 2003, while at FAS, he suffered a serious knee injury which would keep him out for at least 8 months.

International career
Arriola made his debut for Honduras in a June 1994 friendly match against Brazil and has earned a total of 6 caps, scoring no goals. He has represented his country at the 1997 UNCAF Nations Cup.

His final international game was an April 1997 UNCAF Nations Cup match against El Salvador.

References

External links

 Player profile – CD FAS 

1972 births
Living people
People from Tela
Association football forwards
Honduran footballers
Honduras international footballers
Honduran expatriate footballers
C.D. Olimpia players
C.D. Marathón players
C.D. FAS footballers
Liga Nacional de Fútbol Profesional de Honduras players
Expatriate footballers in China
Expatriate footballers in El Salvador